() is a Japanese manufacturer of professional and broadcast television equipment, especially professional video cameras, both for electronic news gathering and studio use.  The company was founded in 1946.

History

Ikegami introduced the first portable hand-held TV camera. The camera made its debut in the United States in May 1962, when CBS used it to document the launching of NASA's Aurora 7 crewed space flight. In 1972, Ikegami introduced the HL-33, the first compact hand-held color video camera for ENG. The compact ENG cameras made live shots easier and—when combined with portable videotape recorders—provided an immediate alternative to 16mm television news film, which required processing before it could be broadcast. In addition to ENG, these cameras saw some use in outside broadcasts in Britain, particularly for roaming footage that was not possible to capture using the much larger tradition OB cameras. The later HL-51 was popular among broadcasters for both ENG and EFP image acquisition.

Although Ikegami is known as a manufacturer of high-quality television cameras, the company does not make video recorder mechanisms (VTRs), and has been a licensee of professional video formats such as Sony's Betacam SP and DVCAM, and Panasonic's DVCPRO. In 1995, Ikegami co-operated with Avid on a tapeless video acquisition format called Editcam, but few were sold. Ikegami developed a tapeless camera format is called GFCAM Toshiba. 

In the early 1980s, Ikegami developed a number of arcade video games as a subcontractor to Japanese video game companies. Among the games they developed are Computer Othello, Block Fever, Monkey Magic, Congo Bongo, Popeye, Donkey Kong, Radar Scope, Sheriff, Space Fever, Space Firebird, Space Demon, Heli Fire, Sky Skipper, Space Launcher, and Zaxxon. At that time, computer programs were not recognized as copyrightable material. According to these sources, Ikegami proceeded to sue Nintendo for unauthorized duplication of the Donkey Kong program code for the latter's creation of Donkey Kong Junior (1983, Tokyo District Court), but it was not until 1989 that the Tokyo High Court gave a verdict that acknowledged the originality of program code. In 1990, Ikegami and Nintendo reached a settlement, terms of which were never disclosed.

Products

Some Ikegami Models included the ITC (Industrial Television Camera)-730, HL-79 HL-55, HL-V55 and HL-99.  Ikegami makes a full line of SDTV and HDTV TV cameras.

Many of the model numbers of Ikegami portable television cameras begin with the initial letters "HL", which stand for "Handy-Looky", an original translation from the Japanese.

External links
 Ikegami broadcast camera used to create captions for outside broadcast production
Ikegami Web
Ikegami USA
ITC-730

References

Electronics companies of Japan
Film and video technology
Manufacturing companies established in 1948
Electronics companies established in 1948
Japanese brands
Japanese companies established in 1948
Ōta, Tokyo